Piravash-e Olya (also Romanized as Pīrāvash-e ‘Olyā; also known as Pīrāvash-e Bālā and Pīrāvash-e Ḩājjī Ḩabīb) is a village in Aq Altin Rural District, in the Central District of Aqqala County, Golestan Province, Iran. At the 2006 census, its population was 606, in 130 families.

References 

Populated places in Aqqala County